Fernando de Liñán y Zofio (19 April 1930 – 27 April 2011) was a Spanish politician who served as Minister of Information and Tourism of Spain in 1973, during the Francoist dictatorship.

References

1930 births
2011 deaths
Information and tourism ministers of Spain
Government ministers during the Francoist dictatorship